WRJJ (104.3 FM) is a radio station licensed to serve the community of La Center, Kentucky. The station is owned by Janet Jensen, and airs an 80's hits format.

The station was assigned the WRJJ call letters by the Federal Communications Commission on October 7, 2008.

References

External links
Official Website
FCC Public Inspection File for WRJJ

RJJ
Radio stations established in 2012
2012 establishments in Kentucky
Ballard County, Kentucky